Angus is an unincorporated community in Boone County, in the U.S. state of Iowa.

History
Angus was originally named "Coaltown", and under the latter name was established as a coal mining community in the 1870s. A post office called Coaltown was established in 1879, the name was changed to Angus in 1881, and the post office closed in the 1950s. The present name "Angus" is after a railroad official.

References

Unincorporated communities in Boone County, Iowa
1870s establishments in Iowa